Paul Darrell West (born 22 June 1970) is an English former footballer and manager. He had a four-year career in the Football League with Port Vale, Bradford City, and Wigan Athletic, before moving on to Evesham United via Morecambe. He spent nine years playing for Evesham, and was appointed as the club's manager in 2007, before stepping down in November 2011. He led the club to the Southern Football League Division One Midlands title in 2007–08, as well as two Worcestershire Senior Cup final victories. He returned to manage the club for the 2012–13 season.

Playing career
West started his semi-professional career with Alcester Town before joining Port Vale in January 1991, signing permanently for a fee of £8,000. He joined the "Valiants" after impressing manager John Rudge and coach Mike Pejic.

However, he was sold to Bradford City in May 1992 for a fee of £80,000, after manager Frank Stapleton and  assistant Colin Todd was impressed when they saw West out play Peter Beagrie. In his first month with the "Bantams", West suffered a stress fracture to the right foot, which kept him on the sidelines for four months.

After 12 months at Valley Parade although with another year on his contract he moved to Wigan Athletic in 1993, after manager Kenny Swain paid out a fee of £50,000. Although plagued by injury, he was highly regarded by Wigan and they showed great faith even when West was not fully fit by offering him a two-year deal. West was desperate to repay that faith but in 1995 in only his third league start against Doncaster Rovers at Belle Vue, West was on the receiving end of a horrendous tackle that left him with serious medial and anterior cruciate ligament damage. He underwent surgery for three major knee operations over a two-year period. West was forced to announce his retirement from full-time football due to his weak knee.

Jim Harvey the former Northern Ireland assistant manager persuaded West to sign for Morecambe on a pay as you play Deal. West went on to make over 50 appearances for the Shrimps. Although West was offered a one-year deal to stay in Lancashire, he returned to the West Midlands to focus on life outside of football. After returning to the engineering company that he had originally left seven years earlier to go into full-time football he also signed a two-year contract with Chris Robinson's Evesham United in the Southern League. He went on to make nearly 400 appearances for the Robins over almost a decade, serving as club captain, before eventually hanging up his boots to join the backroom-staff under manager Phil Mullen.

Management career
West was appointed as Dave Busst's assistant manager in 2005. The club won promotion to the Southern League in 2004–05, but were relegated out of the Premier Division in 2005–06. Busst resigned ten games before the end of the season, with United already heading for the drop, and West was appointed as caretaker-manager. Despite an improvement in results, the club finished one point behind Northwood, who occupied the place above the relegation zone.

West was appointed manager on a permanent basis for the 2006–07 campaign. The club were in poor shape financially, and had to ground-share at St Georges Lane with Worcester City, leaving fans facing a 30-mile round trip every home game. Despite this, Evesham reached the play-offs, where they were beaten by Bromsgrove Rovers. He also led the club to the Worcestershire Senior Cup, with a 1–0 win over Stourbridge over two legs.

He led the club to promotion and the Division One Midlands title in 2007–08, as Evesham finished two points ahead of highly fancied Leamington. They narrowly missed out on qualification for the FA Cup, following a narrow defeat to Halifax Town. The 2008–09 season was highly successful, as the club recorded a ninth-place finish – the highest league position in the club's history. They also reached the First Round of the FA Cup for the first time, where they were beaten by Torquay United at Plainmoor.

A 16th-place finish followed in 2009–10, and they again lifted the Worcestershire Senior Cup, beating Kidderminster Harriers 2–1.
It was West's ability to unearth young quality players which caught the eye with limited resources and funds. He signed Ghanaian players Sammual Mensah, Issac Shaiz and David Accam for the 2010–11 season. Frustrated by issues behind the scenes West felt he had taken the club as far as he could and tendered his resignation in November 2011.

After taking a step back from football for almost a year, West successfully completed his UEFA B Pro license. West returned briefly to management to help Jed Mccrory and assisted Edwin Stein at Southern Premier Division side Banbury United in September 2012 for one game only. West was offered the role of Director of Football and an ambassadorial role at Evesham United. The role was to help in overseeing youth player development and also help in raising the profile of the club. However, with joint-managers Matt Clarke and Robert Elms departing due to poor results there was a fear of Evesham suffering back-to-back relegations and West agreed to return as manager on a short-term basis. West helped steer the club back to the safety of 14th place by the end of the 2012–13 season. Although being offered the manager's job on a permanent basis, West declined but did, however, take up the offer to join the board and return to his original role of director of football. However, after only one month in the position, West resigned with immediate effect after his first, and last, board meeting, citing differences with the chairman and board with issues regarding the vision and overview of the football club going forward. He also got more involved in a football consultancy company that he originally helped set up in 2004 with the late Dean Richards. The company specialises in assisting young professional and semi-professional football players with various and wide-ranging issues such as legal and expertise in various areas.

Outside football
West was a promising cricketer. In his early teens he was part of the Warwickshire Colts set-up at Edgbaston, and was coached by Neal Abberley, Steve Perryman and Steve Rouse at Warwickshire CCC. As well as representing Worcestershire Schools, West also represented the Warwickshire Colts (Under 21s) in the Birmingham League. At senior level West played for Studley CC in the West Midlands Minor Leagues and was selected to represent the Pick of the League in matches against Shropshire Counties and Nottinghamshire Counties. In 1990, West represented Warwickshire Amateur Counties in a national knock-out competition, playing against Worcestershire A Counties and Derbyshire A Counties, and eventually beating Scotland in the semi-final; in the final itself, played at Tunbridge Wells, Warwickshire were beaten by Kent.

At the time of signing professionally for Port Vale in 1991 West was also studying Engineering Management. At the time the chance to become a professional footballer was too much of a lure. West was fortunate the engineering company enabled him to put his Engineering Management apprenticeship on hold. Retiring from full-time football enabled West to return to his Engineering studies. In 1999 West completed his Engineering qualifications and apprenticeship in tandem with still being able to play football at a semi-professional level. West has worked his way up within the Aerospace Engineering Company to board level and in 2011 become a company director.

Career statistics
Source:

Honours
as Evesham United manager
Southern Football League Division One Midlands: 2007–08
Worcestershire Senior Cup: 2007 & 2008

References

Footballers from Birmingham, West Midlands
English footballers
Association football fullbacks
Alcester Town F.C. players
Port Vale F.C. players
Bradford City A.F.C. players
Wigan Athletic F.C. players
Morecambe F.C. players
Evesham United F.C. players
English Football League players
National League (English football) players
Southern Football League players
English football managers
Southern Football League managers
1970 births
Living people